Cyril Donnellan (born 29 October 1985) is an Irish hurler and teacher. His league and championship career at senior level with the Galway county team lasted ten seasons from 2008 until 2017.  

Donnellan made his first appearance for the team during the 2008 championship and immediately became a regular member of the starting fifteen. Since then he has won one Leinster medal and one National Hurling League medal.

On 3 September 2017, Donnellan was a substitute for Galway as they won their first All-Ireland Senior Hurling Championship in 29 years against Waterford.

In November 2017, Donnellan announced his retirement from inter-county hurling.

Donnellan was appointed deputy principal of Coláiste Bhaile Chláir in January 2022.

Honours
Galway
All-Ireland Senior Hurling Championship (1): 2017
National Hurling League Division 1 (2): 2010, 2017
Leinster Senior Hurling Championship (2): 2012, 2017

References

1985 births
Living people
Connacht inter-provincial hurlers
Galway inter-county hurlers
Irish schoolteachers
Pádraig Pearse's hurlers
People from Ballinasloe